Yomi Fash-Lanso (born 7 June 1968) is a Nigerian actor.

Early life 
Yomi Fash-Lanso was born on 7 June 1968, in Ogun State Nigeria, as Oluyomi Fash Lanso.

Career
He earned a degree in Business Administration from the University of Lagos. He acts mostly in Yoruba language films and has more than 100 films to his credit. In 2014, he was nominated for Africa Movie Academy Award for Best Actor in a Supporting Role at the 10th Africa Movie Academy Awards for his role in Omo Elemosho, the same year, he got the award for best actor in a supporting role for his role in Omo Elemosho, from NEA awards which were held in the US.

Selected filmography 
 Aje metta
 Jenifa
 Idoti oju
 Opolo
 Tani kin fe? 
 Temidun
 Kadara Mi
 Omo Elemosho
 Dazzling Mirage (2014)
 Obirin Isonu (2021)
 Citation

References

External links 
 

Male actors from Ogun State
Nigerian male film actors
1968 births
20th-century Nigerian male actors
Living people
Yoruba male actors
Male actors in Yoruba cinema
University of Lagos alumni
Nigerian male television actors
21st-century Nigerian male actors